Yanne Bidonga, also called Yann Bidonga (born 20 March 1979) is a Gabonese football goalkeeper who plays for AS Mangasport in Gabon Championnat National D1.

Career
Born in Bakoumba, Bidonga has spent his entire career playing for Mangasport. He was selected the best goalkeeper in the Gabonese 2009–10 championship.

Bidonga has made several appearances for the Gabon national football team, and played at 2012 Africa Cup of Nations. He made his international debut as a substitute in a friendly again Mali on 18 March 2001.

References 

1979 births
Living people
Gabonese footballers
Gabon international footballers
Association football goalkeepers
2012 Africa Cup of Nations players
People from Haut-Ogooué Province
21st-century Gabonese people